Cnicin is a sesquiterpene lactone, esterified with a substituted acrylic acid, and belonging to the germacranolide class of natural products. It is mainly found in Cnicus (Cnicus benedictus L. (Asteraceae)), and is present in spotted knapweed plants, where highest and lowest concentrations are found in the leaves (0.86-3.86% cnicin) and stems respectively. Cnicin is used as a bitter tonic and the bitterness value is approximately 1,500.

References

External links

Sesquiterpene lactones
Triols
Carboxylate esters
Oxygen heterocycles
Primary alcohols
Vinylidene compounds